Kitfox or kit fox may refer to:
Kit fox, a North American mammal species
Kitfox Games, a Canadian computer games developer
Kit Fox Hills, a mountain range in California, United States
Denney Kitfox, an American kit-built aircraft design